Dover Transportation Center is an Amtrak train station in Dover, New Hampshire, United States. The station is served by five daily Downeaster round trips. An average of 150 passengers board or alight at Dover daily, making it the second-busiest stop in New Hampshire.

History

The Boston & Maine Railroad (B&M) opened its first Dover station, a wood-frame structure with a small train shed, in 1842. It was replaced by a one-story brick structure on July 15, 1874. The B&M ran intercity service to Portland, Maine on its Western Route (now the Pan Am Railways mainline) until January 4, 1965. After Portland service ended, a single commute-hour round trip to Dover ran until June 30, 1967, when it was cut back to Haverhill, Massachusetts.

A new station building was constructed for the introduction of Downeaster service in December 2001. C&J Trailways originally used the building, but later constructed their bus station closer to New Hampshire Route 16. In October 2018, the city approved a five-year lease of the building to a bagel shop.

Bus connections
Bus service is provided by COAST to locations within Dover and the Seacoast Region of New Hampshire as well as UNH Wildcat Transit to Durham and the University of NH.

References

External links

Dover Amtrak Station (USA Rail Guide -- Train Web)

Buildings and structures in Dover, New Hampshire
Amtrak stations in New Hampshire
Stations along Boston and Maine Railroad lines
Transportation buildings and structures in Strafford County, New Hampshire
Railway stations in the United States opened in 2001
Railway stations closed in 1967
Railway stations in the United States opened in 1842